Alberta Brianti was the defending champion, but she lost in the first round to Alexandra Cadanțu.

Kiki Bertens won her first WTA Tour singles title as a qualifier, defeating Laura Pous Tió in the final, 7–5, 6–0.

Seeds

Draw

Finals

Top half

Bottom half

Qualifying

Seeds
The top four seeds received a bye into the second round.

Qualifiers

Lucky loser
  Mathilde Johansson

Draw

First qualifier

Second qualifier

Third qualifier

Fourth qualifier

External links
 Main draw
 Qualifying draw

2012 WTA Tour
2012 Women's Singles
2012 in Moroccan tennis